The men's 200 metres at the 2012 European Athletics Championships was held at the Helsinki Olympic Stadium on 29 and 30 June.

Medalists

Records

Schedule

Results

Round 1
First 4 in each heat (Q) and 4 best performers (q) advance to the Semifinals.

Wind:Heat 1: -0.3 m/s, Heat 2: -1.1 m/s, Heat 3: -0.5 m/s, Heat 4: -0.1 m/s, Heat 5: +0.4 m/s

Semifinals
First 2 in each heat (Q) and 2 best performers (q) advance to the Final.

Wind:Heat 1: -0.3 m/s, Heat 2: -0.1 m/s, Heat 3: -1.7 m/s

Final
Wind: -0.9 m/s

References

Round 1 Results
Semifinal Results
Final Results

200
200 metres at the European Athletics Championships